Runaway Bride is a 1999 American screwball romantic comedy film directed by Garry Marshall, and starring Julia Roberts and Richard Gere. The screenplay, written by Sara Parriott and Josann McGibbon, is about a reporter (Gere) that is assigned to write a story about a woman (Roberts) who has left a string of fiancés at the altar.

It is the second film to co-star Gere and Roberts, following Pretty Woman (1990). It received generally negative reviews from critics but was a commercial success, grossing $309 million worldwide.

Plot
Maggie Carpenter is a spirited and attractive young woman who has had a number of unsuccessful relationships. Maggie, nervous about being married, has left a trail of fiancés waiting for her at the altar on their wedding day. All of these were caught on tape, earning Maggie tabloid fame and the dubious nickname "The Runaway Bride."

Meanwhile, in New York, columnist Homer Eisenhower "Ike" Graham writes an article about her that contains several factual errors, supplied to him by a man he meets in a bar who Ike later learns was one of Maggie's former fiancés. Ike is fired for not verifying his source, but is invited to write an in-depth article about Maggie in a bid to restore his reputation. He travels to Hale, Maryland, where he finds Maggie living with her family and on her fourth attempt to become married. The fourth groom-to-be, Bob Kelly, is a local high school football coach who uses sports analogies to help Maggie with her concerns. He constantly makes references to Maggie "focusing" on the goal-line in reference to their pending nuptials. As Ike starts going around town to meet her friends, family, and former fiancés, Maggie becomes frustrated. Maggie offers Ike the opportunity to spend time with her, to see that she is not a bad person, that she and Bob really will work out. Ike and Maggie become closer the more time they spend together.

As he researches Maggie's history, Ike realizes that Maggie adopts the interests of her fiancés. This is signified most prominently by her choice of eggs, which change with each fiancé. At a pre-wedding celebration for her and Bob, Ike defends Maggie from the public mockery she starts receiving from her family and guests, and Maggie runs outside due to the embarrassment. Ike then confronts Maggie outside about his realization regarding her relationships.

During the wedding rehearsal, Bob tries to quell Maggie's wedding anxieties by walking her down the aisle. Bob asks Ike to stand in for him at the altar, playing the groom. After Bob gets her to the altar, Ike and Maggie share a passionate kiss and admit to each other their feelings. Bob is chagrined, becomes jealous and punches Ike in the face before he storms out of the church. In the aftermath, Ike proposes that he and Maggie get married since the wedding is already arranged. At the wedding, Ike takes Bob's advice and maintains eye contact with Maggie to reassure her as she walks down the aisle. However, a camera flash breaks her concentration and Maggie suddenly gets cold feet and flees. Ike pursues her but she hitches a ride away on a FedEx truck.

Ike returns to New York and Maggie tries to discover herself, trying different types of eggs, and putting her lighting designs up for sale in New York stores. She shows up unexpectedly at Ike's apartment one night where he finds her making friends with his cat, Italics. Maggie then explains that she had been running because every other guy she was engaged to was only engaged to the idea she had created for them rather than the real her, but with Ike she ran because, even though he truly understood her, she did not understand herself. She "turns in" her running shoes just before proposing to Ike. Ike hides his eyes, but she persists. The two are married in a private ceremony outside, on a hill, avoiding the big ceremonies that Maggie notes she never actually liked. In the end, they are shown riding away on horseback while everyone in Hale and New York (clued in via cell phone by Ike and Maggie's family) celebrates the fact that Maggie finally got married.

A post credit scene shows Maggie and Ike playing in the snow signifying that the relationship is going strong after the wedding.

Cast
 Julia Roberts as Margaret "Maggie" Carpenter, a woman who has run away from three weddings but is hoping not to do so on her fourth wedding attempt.
 Richard Gere as Homer Eisenhower "Ike" Graham, a New York City news reporter who writes an article about Maggie and later falls in love with her.
 Joan Cusack as Peggy Flemming, Maggie's best friend and co-worker at beauty salon.  She is married to Corey Flemming, the town's radio announcer.
 Héctor Elizondo as Fisher, Ike's boss who has since married Ike's former wife Ellie.
 Rita Wilson as Ellie Graham, Ike's former wife and editor.  She later marries Ike's boss Fisher.
 Paul Dooley as Walter Carpenter, Maggie's widowed father who owns a hardware store.  He later falls in love with and marries  Mrs. Pressman.
 Christopher Meloni as Bob Kelly, Maggie's fiancé who coaches High School football.
 Donal Logue as Father Brian Norris, the first groom who Maggie dumps at the altar.  He later became a priest.
 Yul Vazquez as Dead Head Gill Chavez, the second groom Maggie dumps at the altar.  He is a musician and car mechanic.
 Reg Rogers as George "Bug Guy" Swilling, the third groom Maggie dumps at the altar.
 Jane Morris as Mrs. Pressman
 Lisa Roberts Gillan as Elaine, Ellie's secretary from Manhattan.
 Kathleen Marshall as Cousin Cindy, Maggie's cousin who isn't married.
 Jean Schertler as Grandma Julia Carpenter, Maggie's grandmother and mother of Walter.  She is an avid runner.
 Sela Ward as pretty woman in bar.
 Garry Marshall (uncredited) as softball first baseman
 Laurie Metcalf (uncredited) as Betty Trout
 Larry Miller (uncredited) as Kevin, New York bartender
 Emily Eby (uncredited) as reporter
 Linda Larkin as Gill's girlfriend

Production

The film was in development for over a decade. Actors attached at various times: Anjelica Huston, Mary Steenburgen, Lorraine Bracco, Geena Davis, Demi Moore, Sandra Bullock, Ellen DeGeneres, Téa Leoni (for the role of Maggie); Christopher Walken, Harrison Ford, Mel Gibson, Michael Douglas (for the role of Ike) and Ben Affleck (for the role of Bob). Director Michael Hoffman was attached.  The film used a number of callbacks to Roberts's and Gere's prior work, Pretty Woman.  These references included the reframing of the store scene where she was blocked from buying the clothes.   Writers Elaine May and Leslie Dixon did unused rewrites.

Much of the film production took place in and around historic Berlin, Maryland, which was made over to become the fictitious town of Hale, Maryland.  Main Street in Berlin as well as some of the landmarks such as the Atlantic Hotel were left nearly as-is during production, while some of the business names on Main Street were changed.

Coco Lee performed the theme song, "Before I Fall in Love."

Release

Box office
The film opened on July 30, 1999 with $12 million on its opening day. In its opening weekend, Runaway Bride peaked at #1 with $35.1 million.

By the end of its run, the film had grossed $152.3 million in the United States and Canada, and an international gross of $157.2 million, altogether making $309.5 million worldwide.

Critical response
On Rotten Tomatoes the film holds an approval rating of 46% based on 87 reviews, with an average rating of 5.31/10. The website's critics consensus reads, "Cliché story with lack of chemistry between Richard Gere and Julia Roberts." According to Metacritic, which assigned the film a weighted average score of 39 out of 100 based on 29 critics, the film received "generally unfavorable reviews". Audiences polled by CinemaScore gave the film an average grade of "A−" on an A+ to F scale.

The Los Angeles Times wrote: "Runaway Bride Josann McGibbon & Sara Parriott script is so muddled and contrived, raising issues only to ignore them or throw them away, you wonder why so many people embraced it." Roger Ebert of the Chicago Sun-Times gave the film 2/4 stars, saying: "After seeing Gere and Roberts play much smarter people (even in romantic comedies), it is painful to see them dumbed down here. The screenplay is so sluggish, they're like Derby winners made to carry extra weight." The New York Times said: "More often, the film is like a ride through a car wash: forward motion, familiar phases in the same old order and a sense of being carried along steadily on a well-used track. It works without exactly showing signs of life."

Soundtrack

Notes

The soundtrack peaked at No. 4 on the Billboard 200 Charts on August 20, 1999.
Track information and credits verified from Discogs, AllMusic, and the album's liner notes.

Certifications

References

External links

 
 
 
 
 
 Film stills

1999 films
1999 romantic comedy films
1990s screwball comedy films
American romantic comedy films
American screwball comedy films
Films about journalists
Films about weddings in the United States
Films directed by Garry Marshall
Films produced by Tom Rosenberg
Films scored by James Newton Howard
Films set in Maryland
Films set in New York City
Films shot in Maryland
Interscope Communications films
Lakeshore Entertainment films
Paramount Pictures films
Touchstone Pictures films
Films produced by Scott Kroopf
1990s English-language films
1990s American films